Adiós gringo is a 1965 Spaghetti Western directed by Giorgio Stegani. It stars Giuliano Gemma and was co produced between Italy, Spain and France. A major success in Italy, it was the 4th highest grossing Italian picture of the year.

Plot
A young rancher, swindled in a cattle deal, kills a rancher, in self-defense, who has accused him of stealing his cattle. He then gets caught up in adventure and romance as he tries to prove his innocence and clear his name.

Cast
 Giuliano Gemma as Brent Landers
 Evelyn Stewart as Lucy Tillson
 Nello Pazzafini as Gil Clawson
 Pierre Cressoy as Clayton Ranchester
 Germano Longo as Stan Clevenger
 Massimo Righi as Avery Ranchester
 Robert Camardiel as Dr. Barfield
 Francisco Brana as Ranchester cowboy
 Osiride Peverello as Ranchester cowboy
 Jesús Puente as Sheriff Tex Slaughter
 Monique Saint Claire as Maude Clevenger

Release
Adiós gringo was released in 1965. On its domestic release in Italy, Adiós gringo was the fourth highest-grossing film of the year. "Byro." commented on the audience reaction to the film at a 22nd street grind house screening in New York which was laughing at the film more than enjoying it.

Reception
From contemporary reviews, "Byro." of Variety stated the film was the "perhaps the most implausible and contrived" of Italian Westerns.

See also
 List of Italian films of 1965

References

Footnotes

Sources

External links 
 

1965 films
Italian Western (genre) films
French Western (genre) films
Spanish Western (genre) films
Spaghetti Western films
1965 Western (genre) films
1960s Italian-language films
Films scored by Benedetto Ghiglia
1960s Italian films
1960s French films